Kenneth Cameron (4 April 1906–1974) was a Scottish footballer who played in the Football League for Bolton Wanderers, Hull City, Middlesbrough, Preston North End and Queens Park Rangers.

References

1906 births
1979 deaths
Scottish footballers
Association football forwards
English Football League players
Preston North End F.C. players
Middlesbrough F.C. players
Bolton Wanderers F.C. players
Hull City A.F.C. players
Queens Park Rangers F.C. players
Rotherham United F.C. players